Bill Wilmore is an American IFBB professional bodybuilder.

About
Wilmore was born in 1971 in Pennsylvania. Wilmore is married.

Career
On top of competing professionally, Wilmore is also a personal trainer.

Contest history
1989 NPC Pennsylvania Championships, Teen, 2nd
1995 NPC Junior Nationals, Heavyweight, 2nd
1995 NPC USA Championships, Heavyweight, 11th
1996 NPC Nationals, HeavyWeight, 13th
1999 NPC Nationals, Super-Heavyweight, 8th
2000 NPC USA Championships, Super-Heavyweight, 3rd
2001 NPC USA Championships, Super-Heavyweight, 6th
2002 NPC Nationals, Super-Heavyweight, 10th
2003 NPC Nationals, Super-Heavyweight, 2nd
2004 NPC Nationals, Super-Heavyweight, 2nd
2005 NPC Nationals, Super-Heavyweight, 1st and Overall
2006 Colorado Pro Championships, 5th
2006 New York Pro Championships, 5th
2006 Mr. Olympia, 16th (tied)

See also
List of male professional bodybuilders
List of female professional bodybuilders

References

Year of birth missing (living people)
Living people
African-American bodybuilders
American bodybuilders
Professional bodybuilders
People from Allegheny County, Pennsylvania
21st-century African-American people